Gualicho (named in reference to the gualichu) is a genus of theropod dinosaur. The type species is Gualicho shinyae. It lived in what is now northern Patagonia, on what was then a South American island continent split off from the supercontinent Gondwana. The fossils were found in the Huincul Formation, dating to the late Cenomanian-early Turonian age of the upper Cretaceous Period, around 91 million years ago.

Discovery
 
On 13 February 2007, Akiko Shinya, preparator of the Field Museum of Natural History, east of the Ezequiel Ramos Mexía Reservoir at the Rancho Violante, discovered the skeleton of a theropod new to science. In 2016, the specimen was named and described by Sebastián Apesteguía, Nathan D. Smith, Rubén Juárez Valieri and Peter J. Makovicky. The generic name is derived from the gualichu, a demon of local folklore. The specific name honours Shinya as the animal's discoverer.

The holotype, MPCN PV 0001, consists of a partial skeleton lacking the skull. It contains four vertebrae of the back, three vertebrae of the middle tail, ribs, a basket of belly-ribs, the left shoulder girdle, the left forelimb, the right lower arm, the lower ends of both pubic bones, the right thighbone, the lower end of the left thighbone, the upper ends of the right shinbone and calf bone, elements of both metatarsi and three toes of the right foot. Most bones were uncovered in their original anatomical position but much of the skeleton had been destroyed by erosion.

Gualicho has been suggested to be synonymous with the megaraptoran Aoniraptor, also known from Huincul Formation and uncovered at the Violante site in view of similarities in their caudal vertebrae. If found to be true, the name Gualicho would have precedent and this would also add a second specimen to Gualicho known as MPCA-Pv 804/1 to 804/25, which would consist of the last sacral vertebra, six proximal caudal vertebrae, four mid-caudal vertebrae, and five haemal arches.

Description

Like the well-known Tyrannosaurus, to which it has been compared, the  Gualicho possesses reduced arms and possibly two fingered hands, although a 2020 study suggests enough of the third metacarpal is present for a third finger. If it is an Allosauroid, this finding indicates that carnosaurs may have been subject to the same evolution of limb-reduction as tyrannosaurids and abelisaurids.

Classification

Phylogenetically, Gualicho presents two scenarios; that megaraptorans and neovenatorids were carnosaurs, or that megaraptorans and neovenatorids were a grade of theropods more closely related to coelurosaurs than to carnosaurs.

The cladogram below follows a 2016 analysis by Sebastián Apesteguía, Nathan D. Smith, Rubén Juarez Valieri, and Peter J. Makovicky.

The cladogram below follows the strict consensus (average result) of the twelve most parsimonious trees (the simplest evolutionary paths, in terms of the total amount of sampled features evolved or lost between sampled taxa) found by Porfiri et al. (2018)'s phylogenetic analysis. Although the results are different, the methodology analysis was practically identical to that of Apesteguia et al. (2016), only differing in the fact that it incorporated Tratayenia and Murusraptor, two megaraptorans not sampled in the analysis of Apesteguia et al.

See also
2016 in paleontology

References 

Neovenatorids
Prehistoric coelurosaurs
Cenomanian life
Turonian life
Late Cretaceous dinosaurs of South America
Cretaceous Argentina
Fossils of Argentina
Huincul Formation
Fossil taxa described in 2016